Ushiroyama Tameike Dam is an earthfill dam located in Gifu Prefecture in Japan. The dam is used for irrigation. The catchment area of the dam is 2.1 km2. The dam impounds about 6  ha of land when full and can store 410 thousand cubic meters of water.

References

Dams in Gifu Prefecture